Timoshino is a rural locality (a village) in Danilovskoye Rural Settlement, Melenkovsky District, Vladimir Oblast, Russia. The population was 135 as of 2010. There are 2 streets.

Geography 
Timoshino is located 23 km northwest of Melenki (the district's administrative centre) by road. Mildevo is the nearest rural locality.

References 

Rural localities in Melenkovsky District